Hollyoaks: In the City is a British television drama series set in Liverpool, first broadcast in 2006. Hollyoaks: In the City is a spin-off of Channel 4 soap opera, Hollyoaks, originally devised by Phil Redmond. It also served as a continuation to 2005's Hollyoaks: Let Loose, which also starred Gemma Atkinson and Marcus Patric.

On 16 November 2006 the writer of the show, Daran Little, announced on his Myspace site that the series had not been recommissioned due to low audience figures.

Synopsis 
After returning home from Sri Lanka, Ben and Lisa move in with Ben's friend "Tank Top" when they cannot afford to purchase their own place. They quickly settle in and plan to purchase a bar in Liverpool. However, Ben is tricked into handing over the deposit to con men. After being given a chance to retrieve his money by a local entrepreneur, Burton, Ben finds himself embroiled in a world of crime and sleaze and he tries to work off his debt.

Lisa starts to work at Burton's modeling agency, Gloss, which is actually a front for an escort agency run by Burton. Lisa befriends Polly (Georgina Walker) who shares a flat with Kay (Kym Marsh) but Kay is murdered after two episodes. Afterwards a story arc involving Kay's murder emerges with many characters under suspicion; Denise Welch guest stars as the detective in charge of investigating the murder. Kay's brother, Mickey, turns up, but is later killed after breaking into Burton's office.

The series also features Oliver Lee as a gay student, Josh, who becomes infatuated with his teacher, Adam (Philip Olivier). The producers made the decision of breaking up Ben and Lisa, with Ben ending up with Polly and Lisa sleeping her way through the male characters. Lisa briefly turns to escorting as does Ben when he sleeps with Stella (Claire King) so that Polly is able to give up escorting. However it is clear Lisa and Ben are still in love with each other.

The final episode comes to a dramatic climax as Debbie finds out the truth that Polly isn't her real sister and runs off to find Josh; Polly later appears to commit suicide by overdosing; and Josh and Adam get together briefly, but when Adam kisses another man at the nightclub, Josh runs off distraught. Lisa is abducted by clients of Stella who intend to use her in a snuff pornographic film, whilst Ben, Burton and Tank Top frantically rush to find her. This ends in tragedy when Lisa, whilst trying to escape, accidentally shoots Ben in the stomach and he dies in her arms. This brings an end to the show.

The themes introduction was composed by Luke Blu.

Characters 
Main cast
 Gemma Atkinson plays Lisa Hunter. Model and secretary to Burton, who becomes deeper and more involved in the glamorous lifestyle.
 Marcus Patric plays Ben Davies. Lisa's boyfriend and a doorman to Burton's exclusive nightclub. He fast becomes Burton's favourite henchman.
 Lee Warburton plays Burton Phillips. Lisa and Ben's employer, Burton is wealthy, bisexual and straight to the point.
 Georgina Walker plays Polly. The sister of Debbie, Polly frequently "whores herself" although does not enjoy it.
 Philip Olivier plays Adam Tyler, a teacher at the local school. He begins to develop feelings for one of his male students, leading towards a catalyst of events.
 Alexis Hall plays model scout Precious, in love with Troy and insanely jealous of the females who get his attention. Cunning and sly, but a good friend.
 Oliver Lee plays Joshua Jones, a gay 16-year-old, taught by both Adam and Millie.
 Leon Lopez plays Tank Top, Ben, Adam and Lisa's flatmate and another of Burton's bouncers.
 Bryony Seth plays Debbie, Polly's sister and Josh's best friend. She wants to be just like her sister, not knowing the truth of her sister's jobs.
 Effie Woods plays Millie, Adam's posh girlfriend, a teacher at the local school, who just wants to be loved.
 Adam-Jon Fiorentino plays Troy, a not very bright, Australian, wannabe actor, who trades sex with Burton for jobs.
 Kym Marsh (2 episodes) plays Kay Price. The mother of Burton's daughter Melanie, and one of the more renowned models/prostitutes employed by Burton. Kay was murdered after being filmed in a snuff movie.

Recurring cast
 Nick Hayes plays Orson Buxton, the courier to the modelling agency, film buff and wannabe director who gets beaten up by Ben, then gets close to Lisa.
 Charlotte Hughes plays Lauren.
 Elaine Tan plays Gucci, the funky Chinese model.
 Wynnie la Freak plays Connie, the local drag queen upstairs.
 Claire King plays Stella, a business woman, not unlike Burton, who appears to be willing to do anything for money. She does however seem to have a compassionate streak below the surface, secretly hating what she does to people.
 Faye McKeever plays Donna Marie
 Oliver Mellor plays Det. Monroe.

Episodes

References

External links 
 

2006 British television series debuts
2006 British television series endings
E4 (TV channel) original programming
Channel 4 television dramas
2000s British drama television series
I
British television spin-offs